Wayne Laugesen is an American columnist, video producer, gun rights advocate and editorial page editor of the Colorado Springs Gazette. Laugesen writes for The Washington Examiner, the National Catholic Register, Faith & Family magazine, is a former editor of Soldier of Fortune, Boulder Weekly, and was managing editor of the former "Consumers' Research" national magazine in Washington, D.C. Laugesen has produced the international Catholic prayer series, "Holy Baby!".

Urban planning
Laugesen, who considers himself a conservative libertarian, has criticized urban planners who advocate "affordable housing" while harming minorities and the poor with anti-growth policies. His work became the topic of a journalistic ethics debate in 2004, when he smashed historic windows from a Boulder, Colorado, home in protest of historic preservation orders by the Boulder City Council—an act that led media critic Michael Roberts to coin the phrase "commando journalism".

Guns
As assistant editor of Soldier of Fortune in the 1990s, Laugesen helped obtain guns and training for women in a Boulder neighborhood that was stalked by a serial rapist.

He brought an obscure vice principal to the forefront by giving him Soldier of Fortune'''s annual Humanitarian Award for using a handgun to stop a school massacre in Pearl, Mississippi.

Laugesen stirred controversy among Soldier of Fortune's conservative readership with a cover story that criticized modern police for exceeding their authority and violating the rights of citizens. Timothy McVeigh, four years after perpetrating the 1995 Alfred P. Murrah Federal Building bombing,  was asked by reporters to "describe his motivations" for his lethal actions. McVeigh mailed a copy of the March 1999 Soldier of Fortune'' article along with a letter to Fox News reporter Rita Cosby.

Catholic sex abuse scandal
As the National Catholic Register's correspondent covering the United States Conference of Catholic Bishops when the Catholic sexual abuse scandal emerged, Laugesen is often cited for research that has put the problem in context by comparing abuse statistics of Catholic institutions with those of other religious and secular organizations.

Drugs
Though preferring to be seen as a social conservative, Laugesen has been critical of the war on drugs. His drug war research often appears on web sites hosted by the National Organization for the Reform of Marijuana Laws and other organizations devoted to drug legalization. Laugesen's research into the DARE program (Drug Abuse Resistance Education) has led to articles that have been used in campaigns to get DARE out of public and private schools.

Laugesen and The Gazette's editorial board were widely criticized in 2015 for producing the series "Clearing the Haze," which blasted state regulations and regulators for problems with Colorado's recreational and medicinal marijuana industries.

Religious controversies
Laugesen often defends Israel and Judaism, but was accused of anti-semitism in a 2008 article in the Independent, an alternative newsweekly that intercepted an e-mail conversation between Laugesen and an official of the Military Religious Freedom Foundation, an organization that fights against military efforts to establish religion. Other media reported on the controversy and the allegations were quickly refuted.

A defender of religious liberty, Laugesen has become a frequent topic of criticism by atheist leader PZ Myers. Dozens of other well-known atheist activists have come out against Laugesen, including the atheist expert of About.com.

Laugesen has stirred controversy in Colorado and the mostly-conservative Christian city of Colorado Springs by advocating for Mosques, inviting them to build in Colorado. Conversely, Laugesen routinely defended the former Denver Broncos rookie quarterback Tim Tebow against attacks from the secular media.

Laugesen was featured on national television and radio to discuss the Denver City Council's 2015 opposition to Chick-fil-A in Denver International Airport, as a result of CEO Dan Cathy's statements and donations in support of traditional marriage and family.

Video producer
Laugesen and his wife, Dede, are co-producers of Holy Baby! and Holy Baby! 2, a popular set of multilingual prayer videos for Catholic children that have been referred to as the Catholic Baby Einstein.

Personal
Laugesen, a Philadelphia native, explains that his philosophy was heavily influenced by the sudden death of his father, his widowed mother, his conservative stepfather and author M. Stanton Evans, founder of the National Journalism Center.

References

External links

American columnists
Living people
Year of birth missing (living people)